Lawrence Creek may refer to:

Lawrence Creek (California), a river in California
Lawrence Creek (Kentucky), a river in Kentucky
Lawrence Creek, Oklahoma, a town in Oklahoma